The Women's synchronized 10 metre platform competition at the 2022 World Aquatics Championships was held on 30 June 2022.

Results
The preliminary round was started on 30 June at 09:00.
The final was started on 30 June at 17:00.

References

Women's synchronized 10 metre platform